Akinola is both a given name and a surname.

Notable people with the given name include:
Akinola Aguda (1923–2001), Nigerian jurist
Akinola Maja, Nigerian physician, businessman and politician

Notable people with the surname include:
Aniff Akinola, British DJ
Ayo Akinola (born 2000), Canadian footballer
Bolaji Akinola, Nigerian maritime expert
Charles Akindiji Akinola (born 1956), Nigerian politician, businessman and consultant
Modupe Akinola, American psychologist
Peter Akinola (born 1944), Nigerian Anglican archbishop
Segun Akinola, British composer for television and documentaries
Simeon Akinola (born 1992), Spanish-Nigerian footballer 
Tunji Akinola, footballer
Yewande Akinola (born 1985), Nigerian engineer

Given names